Ana Maria Filip (born Ana Maria Căta-Chițiga; 20 June 1989) is a Romanian-born French professional basketball player who plays as a center for Tango Bourges Basket and the French national team. She participated at the 2014 FIBA World Championship and at the 2015 EuroBasket.

In June 2019, she was selected in the French 3x3 team that finished third in the world championship, and then was European champion. She was named best player of this competition. She qualified for the 2020 Summer Olympics.

Achievements
LFB:
Winner: 2008, 2009
Coupe de France:
Winner: 2008, 2009, 2013
Tournoi de la Fédération:
Winner: 2008

Personal life
She's the daughter of two former Romanian international players, Camelia Filip (basketball) and Marius Căta-Chițiga (volleyball).

References

External links
 
 
 
 
 

1989 births
Living people
Basketball players from Bucharest
French women's basketball players
Romanian women's basketball players
Centers (basketball)
Place of birth missing (living people)
Romanian emigrants to France
Naturalized citizens of France
3x3 basketball players at the 2020 Summer Olympics
Olympic 3x3 basketball players of France
French women's 3x3 basketball players